Abeguwo is a goddess of Melanesian mythology in the area of Melanesia and New Guinea. She resides in the sky, and when she feels the urge to urinate, does so onto the Earth in the form of rain.

References
 Godchecker.com entry on Abeguwo

Melanesian mythology
Papua New Guinean deities
Rain deities
Oceanian deities